is a former Japanese baseball player. He played for the Yomiuri Giants in the Nippon Professional Baseball. Shozo Doi also served as a manager for Ichiro Suzuki.

He was highly hated during his time as manager of the Orix BlueWave from 1991 to 1993 because he replaced longtime manager Toshiharu Ueda, who led the team to their 3 Japan Series titles under Hankyu. This also caused key player Greg "Boomer" Wells to request a trade to the Fukuoka Daiei Hawks because Doi (unlike Ueda), did not listen or even care that he was a triple crown winner, won 2 Gold Gloves or was an 8-year NPB veteran, and only saw him as a foreign player who should do as he was told. Under Ueda, Wells built himself as a respected member of the clubhouse. Because of this, the Braves ouendan would constantly taunt Doi from then on when he took the field until he was fired in 1993.

References 

1942 births
2009 deaths
Japanese baseball players
Managers of baseball teams in Japan
Nippon Professional Baseball second basemen
Nippon Professional Baseball shortstops
Orix BlueWave managers
People from Kobe
Rikkyo University alumni
Yomiuri Giants players